Ousman Sallah (born 18 February 1968) is a Gambian athlete. He competed in the men's long jump at the 1996 Summer Olympics.

References

1968 births
Living people
Athletes (track and field) at the 1996 Summer Olympics
Gambian male long jumpers
Olympic athletes of the Gambia
Place of birth missing (living people)